The Queen Was in the Parlour is a 1927 Anglo-German silent drama film directed by Graham Cutts and starring Lili Damita, Louis Ralph and Paul Richter. It was based on the Noël Coward play The Queen Was in the Parlour. Its German title was Die letzte Nacht.

Production
The film was made as part of an Anglo-German co-production between Gainsborough Pictures and the leading German company UFA. It was shot at UFA's Babelsberg Studio in Berlin. It was the first of several co-productions between Gainsborough and German companies.

Cast
 Lili Damita as Nadya
 Louis Ralph as Prince Alex
 Paul Richter as Sabien Pascal
 Harry Liedtke as Prince Keri
 Trude Hesterberg as Herzogin Xenia
 Rudolf Klein-Rogge as General Kish
 Ernő Verebes as King's Adjutant
 Frida Richard as Zana

References

Bibliography
 Cook, Pam (ed.). Gainsborough Pictures. Casssell, 1997.
 Low, Rachael. History of the British Film, 1918-1929. George Allen & Unwin, 1971.

External links

 

1927 films
1927 drama films
British drama films
Films of the Weimar Republic
British silent feature films
German silent feature films
Films directed by Graham Cutts
British films based on plays
Gainsborough Pictures films
Films set in Paris
Films shot at Babelsberg Studios
Films set in Europe
UFA GmbH films
British black-and-white films
German black-and-white films
1920s British films
Silent drama films